The 1948 Cornell Big Red football team was an American football team that represented Cornell University during the 1948 college football season.  In its second season under head coach George K. James, the team compiled a 8–1 record and outscored opponents 224 to 112.

Cornell played its home games in Schoellkopf Field in Ithaca, New York.

Schedule

References

Cornell
Cornell Big Red football seasons
Cornell Big Red football